James Workman may refer to:
James Workman (rower)
James Workman (writer)